Hank Snow was a Canadian country music singer-songwriter and musician. His discography consists of 46 studio albums and 89 singles. Of his 89 singles, seven reached number 1 on the U.S. Billboard Hot Country Songs charts and two reached number 1 on the Canadian RPM Country Tracks chart. Snow spent his entire recording career with RCA Victor records. Snow had his first hit in the United States in 1950 with I'm Moving On and his final hit in 1974 with Hello Love, at the time he was the oldest country singer to have a Number #1 charted record.

Studio albums

1950s
{| class="wikitable plainrowheaders" style="text-align:center;"
|-
! style="width:25em;"| Title
! style="width:18em;"| Details
|-
! scope="row"| Country Classics
|
Release date: March 1952
Label: RCA Victor
|-
! scope="row"| Hank Snow Sings
|
Release date: October 1952
Label: RCA Victor
|-
! scope="row"| Hank Snow Salutes Jimmie Rodgers
|
Release date: April 1953
Label: RCA Victor
|-
! scope="row"| Just Keep a-Movin|
Release date: March 1955
Label: RCA Victor
|-
! scope="row"| Old Doc Brown and Other Narrations by Hank Snow
|
Release date: October 1955
Label: RCA Victor
|-
! scope="row"| Country & Western Jamboree
|
Release date: 1957
Label: RCA Victor
|-
! scope="row"| Hank Snow's Country Guitar
|
Release date: 1957
Label: RCA Victor
|-
! scope="row"| Hank Snow Sings Sacred Songs
|
Release date: March 1958
Label: RCA Victor
|-
! scope="row"| When Tragedy Struck
|
Release date: January 1959
Label: RCA Victor
|}

1960s

1970s

Collaboration albums

Compilations

Singles

1940s and 1950s

1960s

1970s

Collaboration singles

Charted B-sides

Notes

A ^''' Christmas with Hank Snow'' peaked at number 72 on the Christmas Albums chart.

References

External Links
 

Country music discographies
Discographies of Canadian artists